EGX (previously named Eurogamer Expo) is a trade fair for video games organised by Gamer Network and held annually in the United Kingdom and Germany.

History

The first Eurogamer Expo took place at the Old Truman Brewery as part of the London Games Festival 2008 and was attended by 4,000 people. In 2009, the show took place at The Royal Armouries in Leeds and the Old Billingsgate Market in London at the end of October. The event was held at London's Earls Court for the next five years between 2010 and 2014. After the confirmation of the venue's closure, it was announced that EGX would be moving to Birmingham's National Exhibition Centre as part of a multi-year deal.

In 2012, Eurogamer and Rock, Paper, Shotgun announced Rezzed, a PC and indie games show spun off from Eurogamer Expo. Rezzed was first held at the Brighton Centre on 6–7 July 2012. In September 2012, Eurogamer announced that Eurogamer Expo would also host a Rezzed component.

In October 2013, the Eurogamer Expo was renamed to EGX London, and Rezzed was renamed EGX Rezzed. The EGX London brand was discontinued in 2014, and following the move to Birmingham NEC the show has been called simply EGX.

On 21 February 2018, a third event in Berlin, Germany, was announced.

On 28 November 2018, it was also announced that EGX 2019 would be returning to the ExCel, London.

On 13 March 2020, EGX Rezzed 2020 was originally going to take place from 26 to 28 March 2020, but was postponed to 2–4 July 2020 due to the COVID-19 pandemic before being cancelled altogether. Three months later on 30 June 2020, it was announced that EGX 2020, which was originally going to take place from 17 to 20 September 2020, was also cancelled. On the same day, EGX announced that it was joining forces with PAX to hold a 9-day online event, which will take place from 12 to 20 September 2020, a month later on 27 July 2020, the online event was given a name called PAX Online X EGX Digital.

On 19 February 2021, it was announced that EGX Rezzed and EGX would be returning as live, real-world, in-person events if everything goes to plan with the roll out of COVID-19 vaccinations and they deem it safe to do so within the government guidelines. 

On 11 October 2021, it was announced that EGX Rezzed would be renamed as EGX Birmingham and would be returning to the National Exhibition Centre, Birmingham. The renamed EGX Birmingham aims to expand the “Rezzed Zone”, and will offer not just the typical indie showcases, but also allow AAA studios to showcase some spring releases as well. It was originally planned to take place from 4 to 6 March 2022, but was postponed to 2023 due to "the current climate and the knock-on effects of Omicron".

List of events

References

External links
 

2008 establishments in the United Kingdom
Annual events in the United Kingdom
Recurring events established in 2008
Tourist attractions in the United Kingdom
Trade fairs in the United Kingdom
Video game trade shows
Video gaming in the United Kingdom